Carl Scarborough (July 3, 1914 – May 30, 1953) was an American racecar driver. He died from heat exhaustion during the 1953 Indianapolis 500, a race in which several drivers experienced heat-related illness. The race was Scarborough's second entry in the Indianapolis 500. He had also been the national champion in both big car and midget car racing. After he died, race officials announced plans to inspect Indy 500 vehicles for suitable ventilation.

Early life and career
Scarborough was born in Benton, Illinois on July 3, 1914. Before his entries in the Indianapolis 500, he had participated in "outlaw" racing in Michigan, Indiana and Ohio. Early in his racing career, Scarborough sat out for two years after sustaining injuries as the passenger in a car crash. In 1946, Scarborough was the national midget car racing champion. He also won the national big car title that year, becoming the first driver named the Central States Racing Association national champion in both categories.

While attempting to qualify for the 1951 Indianapolis 500, he ran the second fastest qualifying lap that had ever been recorded at the Indianapolis Motor Speedway. He finished 18th in that race; within four years, eleven of the 35 men in the 1951 race's starting lineup had died, mostly in race-related incidents.

Death and legacy
Scarborough started the 1953 Indianapolis 500 on the seventh row. During Scarborough's first pit stop, he felt sick from the heat and fumes at the race. After a fuel spill during the pit stop, a minor fire broke out involving the side of Scarborough's car. Scarborough climbed over the pit wall and collapsed onto a chair. Bob Scott replaced Scarborough on the track. Scott's own car had experienced mechanical difficulties early in the race. He finished the race for Scarborough in twelfth place.

Scarborough was taken to the speedway's hospital, where he died. Physicians there unsuccessfully performed open-heart massage before Scarborough was pronounced dead. Driver Pat Flaherty suffered minor injuries when he fainted and crashed into a wall later in the race. The track temperature reached .

Scarborough was the second person to die at that year's event. Chet Miller died in a crash during a practice run before the official start of the race.

At the time of his death, Scarborough lived in Clarkston, Michigan with his wife and three children. He had been racing in some capacity for 18 years. After Scarborough's death, Indy 500 officials instituted a new rule that cars would be inspected to ensure adequate ventilation before the following year's race. Scarborough was elected to the Michigan Motor Sports Hall of Fame in 1985.

Indy 500 results

See also
List of sportspeople who died during their careers

References

External links
 

1914 births
1953 deaths
People from Benton, Illinois
Racing drivers from Illinois
Indianapolis 500 drivers
Sports deaths in Indiana
Deaths from hyperthermia